Poplar Grove Township may refer to the following townships in the United States:

 Poplar Grove Township, Boone County, Illinois
 Poplar Grove Township, Roseau County, Minnesota